Bad Vibes is the third studio album by Lloyd Cole. It was released in October 1993 on Fontana Records and reached number 38 on the UK Albums Chart and number 8 on the Swedish chart.

Track listing
 "Morning Is Broken" – 5:19
 "So You'd Like to Save the World" – 3:30
 "Holier Than Thou" – 3:53
 "Love You So What" – 3:26
 "Wild Mushrooms" – 2:09
 "My Way to You" – 4:18
 "Too Much of a Good Thing" – 5:04
 "Fall Together" – 4:50
 "Mister Wrong" – 3:24
 "Seen the Future" – 3:21
 "Can't Get Arrested" – 8:25

1994 reissue bonus tracks
 "For the Pleasure of Your Company" – 3:42
 "4 M.B." – 4:46

Personnel
Lloyd Cole
Ann Charlotte Vensgaarde
Anton Fier
"Lightning" Bob Hoffnar
Curtis Watts
Dan McCarroll
Dana Vlcek
Fred Maher
John Valentine Carruthers
John Micco
Matthew Sweet
Neil Clark
Peter Mark
Technical
Dave O'Donnell, Fred Kevorkian, Jon Goldberger, Lloyd Puckitt, Michael White, Mike Krowiak - recording engineer
Bob Clearmountain – mixing
David Sims - photography

Charts

References

1993 albums
Lloyd Cole albums
Fontana Records albums